Oscar Michael Görres (born 20 March 1986), also known as OzGo, is a Swedish record producer, songwriter, and musician. He is best known for writing and producing songs with the likes of MARINA, Taylor Swift, 5 Seconds of Summer,  Maroon 5, DNCE, Britney Spears, Tove Lo and Pink. Görres is a part of Max Martin's production team, Wolf Cousins.

Production discography

References

1986 births
Living people
Musicians from Stockholm
Swedish record producers
Swedish songwriters